The 1966–67 UC Irvine Anteaters men's basketball team represented the University of California, Irvine during the 1966–67 NCAA College Division men's basketball season. The Anteaters were led by second year head coach Danny Rogers and played their home games at Campus Hall. They finished their second season 15–11.

Previous season
In their inaugural season of intercollegiate athletics, the 1965–66 Anteaters finished with a record of 15–11.

Roster

Schedule

|-
!colspan=9 style=|Regular Season

Source

References

UC Irvine Anteaters men's basketball seasons
UC Irvine Anteaters
UC Irvine Anteaters